John Wick: Chapter 2 (Original Motion Picture Soundtrack) is the soundtrack album to the 2017 film John Wick: Chapter 2. The second instalment in the John Wick franchise and a sequel to 2014 action film John Wick, the film stars Keanu Reeves in the title character, and is directed by Chad Stahelski. The album featured 23 tracks from the original score composed by Tyler Bates and Joel J. Richard, plus songs performed by Le Castle Vania and Ciscandra Nostalghia, all of them contributed to the first film's soundtrack. Jerry Cantrell, guitarist and co-lead vocalist of Alice in Chains performed an original song titled "A Job to Do", released on February 9, 2017. The album was released by Varèse Sarabande on the following day, along with the film.

Development 
Tyler Bates and Joel J. Richard returned to score for John Wick: Chapter 2 after previously scoring for the first film. Bates called the score as "more aggressive" and "frenetic" than the first film, which Richard recalled that Stahelski insisted to use Italian influence for the story that is set in Rome, that inspired the instrumental uses of cello, mandolin, operatic vocals and influence of Antonio Vivaldi's compositions, which was "a matter of finding instrumentation and a musical language that alluded to Italy’s rich musical history while working within the gritty and modern sound of John Wick". Bates added that the mixture of opera into the score "made the dark sense of humor (buried in the floor with John’s weapons and coins) rather apparent." Experimenting with the themes, Bates used the gun rhythms and designed the score and soundtrack based on that, as the film had multiple gunshots. Stahelski added "You don't want the music to be in conflict with the actual, practical onscreen sounds."

Ciscandra Nostalghia performed two songs for Chapter 2's soundtrack: "Plastic Heart" and "Coronation". Speaking of his collaboration with Bates, Nostalghia said "He [Bates] really understands the emotional properties of darkness. He’s able to translate it beautifully into music without completely depleting you or serotonin. There’s still an ounce of hope which I personally feel is very important. So we’ve created some wonderfully heavy songs together and the collaborations have been a real experience."

Le Castle Vania also performed the track "John Wick Mode" written by Dylan Eiland, and Jerry Cantrell, guitarist and co-lead vocalist of Alice in Chains performed the original song "A Job to Do". He wrote the song lyrics from John Wick's perspective, and Cantrell explained that "Writing specifically for a movie was kind of fun. It almost felt like an assignment that I gave to myself. It's not unlike how I normally write from a personal point of view, whether mine or someone else's." The song was released as a single from the film at the Billboard website on February 9, 2017 and was accompanied by a music video featuring Cantrell and Reeves, that was released on March 21, 2017 through YouTube. On December 6, 2019, the song was performed live by Cantrell at the Pico Union Project in Los Angeles, with Bates playing guitar at the concert.

Release 
The John Wick: Chapter 2 soundtrack was released by Varèse Sarabande on February 10, 2017, the same day as the film. It was first released in digital formats, and was physically released on March 10, 2017. A two-disc vinyl edition was released on November 15, 2019, along with the vinyl soundtracks for its predecessor (John Wick) and successor (Chapter 3 – Parabellum).

Track listing

Personnel 
Credits adapted from AllMusic.

 All music composed and produced by: Tyler Bates, Joel J. Richard
 Featuring artists: Ciscandra Nostalghia, Le Castle Vania, Jerry Cantrell
 Bass vocals: Tyler Bates
 Guitar: Jerry Cantrell
 Drums: Gil Sharone
 Financial director: Chris Brown
 Programming: Justin Burnett, Dieter Hartmann, Tim Williams
 Engineer: Paul Fig
 Mastering: Patricia Sullivan
 Mixing: Joel Richard, Wolfgang Matthes
 Score preparation: Joanne Higginbottom
 Music supervisor: John Houlihan
 Music business affairs: Raha Johartchi, Jessica Villar, Lenny Wohl
 Music coordinator: John Katovsich, Lilly Reid, Ryan Svendsen, Nikki Triplett, Jessica Villar
 Music clearance and licensing: Matt Lilley
 Executive producer: Robert Townson
 Executive director: Nikki Triplett, Raha Johartchi
 General manager: Lenny Wohl
 Executive in charge of music: Amy Dunning

References 

2017 soundtrack albums
John Wick
Tyler Bates soundtracks
Varèse Sarabande soundtracks
Hip hop soundtracks
Electronic soundtracks
Rock soundtracks